Sveti Andrej is a small settlement in the Municipality of Moravče in central Slovenia. The area is part of the traditional region of Upper Carniola. It is now included with the rest of the municipality in the Central Slovenia Statistical Region.

History
Sveti Andrej was merged with Dole pri Krašcah in 1955. It was separated again from Dole pri Krašcah in 1992.

Church

The local church, after which the settlement is named, is dedicated to Saint Andrew. It belongs to the Parish of Moravče. Its oldest parts date to the 15th century, but it was extended and rebuilt in the 16th and 18th centuries.

References

External links

Sveti Andrej on Geopedia

Populated places in the Municipality of Moravče